Bone morphogenetic protein 8 (BMP8) may refer to:

 Bone morphogenetic protein 8A (BMP8A)
 Bone morphogenetic protein 8B (BMP8B)

See also
 Bone morphogenetic protein